Ghana Senior High School, Koforidua, popularly known as GHANASS, is a high school in Koforidua. It was preceded by the establishment of two colleges that ultimately combined into what is currently known as The Beacon of the East

History
In 1943, Fred Addae and Francis Adjei Tetebo established a school with  16 boys called Phoenix College in a temporary building. By 1950, an increase in students necessitated a new location which today houses the Normal Technical Institute, Koforidua. The change in location brought in its wake a change in the school's name from Phoenix College to Christ College. The location of the premises had to change again after some time to respond to the increasing student population. Thus, the school moved into Effiduase where it was housed at the current premises of Effiduase Police Quarters in Koforidua, Ghana. This was made possible by the efforts of Rev. Dr. Nimako, the first MP for New Juaben Constituency, Mr WT Wutor, a contractor and Nana Frempong Mposo II, the then chief of Effiduase. During this period, Mr. Francis Adjei Tetebo was the Principal of the college. Mr Fred Addae the headmaster had then died.

Later developments
In 1957, the year that Ghana gained independence, Osagyefo Dr. Kwame Nkrumah on a visit to Koforidua requested a name change of the school from Christ College to Ghana Secondary School. The change was so that the new name could be in line with other government established secondary schools such as the Ghana National College in Cape Coast and the Ghana Secondary Technical School in Takoradi. When the school was absorbed into the public school system, Mr. Daniel Ofori Dankwa who was then a Science teacher at Accra Academy was encouraged to come and steer the affairs of the establishment. In that same year, the first Speech and Prize - Giving Day was organized. The school then had a population of 100 boys and 6 girls with a staff of only 6. By dint of hardwork, Mr D. Ofori Dankwa continued to develop the school  until 1974 when he was promoted to  Director of Education. He was succeeded by Rev. R. P. Nyarko.

The school now has a population of over two thousand three hundred students (males and females) with a staff population of about eighty well qualified and trained teachers.

Headteachers

School motto
The motto of the school is Pro Patria. This motto seeks to instill in all who pass through Ghanass a sense of patriotism to offer dedicated service to the school and to the nation.

School anthem
The school anthem was composed in 1979 by Mr. Boniface H. Adjei who was a Music Master of GHANASS at the time.

School jingle
The school jingle was composed by W.N.K Amamoo.

References

High schools in Ghana
Education in the Eastern Region (Ghana)
Koforidua